The Recorder of Liverpool or, since 1971, the Honorary Recorder of Liverpool is an ancient legal office in the City of Liverpool, England. The Recorder is appointed by the Crown. The Recorder of Liverpool is also a Senior Circuit Judge of the Liverpool Crown Court in the North West Circuit. They are addressed in court as "My Lord" or "My Lady"

List of Recorders of Liverpool

 Alexander Rughleye (1541–)
 Henry Halsall (1572–)
 Edward Halsall (c.1579)
 Sir Thomas Hesketh (died 1602) 
 Leonard Chorley (1602–1608) (died 1608) 
 Edward Halsall   
 Thomas Molyneux (1620–)  
 Hugh Rigby (1634–)  
 William Langton ( mid-1600s - died 1659)
 John Lightbourne  
 John Entwisle (1662–1709) 
 Bertin Entwisle (1709–1722) 
 Owen Salusbury Brereton (1742–1798)
 Francis Hargrave (1798–c1806)
 James Clarke (c.1815-1844)
 Gilbert Henderson (1844–c.1855) (died 1861)
 John Bridge Aspinall (1862–1886)
 Charles Henry Hopwood (1886–1904)
 Sir William Pickford, 1st Baron Sterndale 
(1904–1907)  
 Henry Gordon Shee (1907–1909) 
 Edward Hemmerde (1909–1948) 
 Sir William Gorman (1948–1950) 
 Harry Ince Nelson (1950–1954) 
 Graham Rogers (1954–1956) 
 Neville Laski (1956–1963) 
 Sir Stephen Chapman (1963–1966) 
 Sir William Gerard Morris (1966–1967) 
 Sir Ralph Kilner Brown (1967–1969) 
 Sir Rudolph Lyons (1970–1971)

Honorary Recorders of Liverpool

 Sir Rudolph Lyons (1972–1977)
 Sir Ernest Sanderson Temple (1978–1991)
 William Rayley Wickham (1992–1997)
 Sir David Clive Clarke (1997–2003)
 Sir Henry Globe (2003–2011)
 Clement Goldstone (3 October 2011 to 8 April 2019)
 Andrew Menary, QC (9 April 2019 – present)

References

 
Liverpool
Lawyers from Liverpool